Jonesville is an unincorporated community in Grant County, Kentucky, United States. Jonesville has a post office with ZIP code 41052.

References

Unincorporated communities in Grant County, Kentucky
Unincorporated communities in Kentucky